Jerome Weidman (April 4, 1913, New York City – October 6, 1998, New York City) was an American playwright and novelist. He collaborated with George Abbott on the book for the musical Fiorello! with music by Jerry Bock, and lyrics by Sheldon Harnick. All received the 1960 Pulitzer Prize for Drama for the work.

Biography
Weidman was born in Manhattan, New York City, and moved with his family to The Bronx after finishing high school at DeWitt Clinton. His parents were Jewish immigrants and his father Joseph worked in the garment trade. He also worked in the garment industry, which later provided him with book material, and attended City College of New York and New York University Law School, all the while writing stories and finally novels.

In his work he wrote about the "rough underside of business and politics -- and daily life -- in New York." The Independent obituary states: "There was precious little hope of salvation - indeed, precious little hope - in his early novels and often dazzling and highly crafted short stories, many of which inevitably found their way into Harold Ross's New Yorker during its Golden Age of the late Thirties and early Forties."

In the 1950s he used his ability for "speakable dialogue" in writing for the movies, which led to working with George Abbott on the musical Fiorello! in 1959.

He wrote the book for the musical I Can Get It for You Wholesale which was based on his first novel, and was Barbra Streisand's Broadway debut. The book was the source for a 1951 movie starring Susan Hayward, but used mainly the title.

He married Peggy Wright in 1942 and had two sons, John and Jeffrey.

Archive 
The papers of Jerome Weidman are held at the Harry Ransom Center at the University of Texas at Austin. There are over 100 boxes of Weidman's personal papers, including manuscript drafts of books, plays, musicals, essays, and extensive correspondences.

Bibliography

Novels 
 I Can Get It for You Wholesale (1937)
 What's in It for Me? (1938)
 I'll Never Go There Any More (1941)
 The Lights Around the Shore
 Too Early to Tell (1946)
 The Price Is Right (1949)
 Give Me Your Love (1952)
 The Hand of the Hunter (1953)
 The Third Angel (1953)
 Your Daughter Iris (1955)
 The Enemy Camp (1958)
 Before You Go (1960)
 The Sound of Bow Bells (1962)
 Word Of Mouth (1964)
 Other People's Money (1967)
 The Centre of the Action (1969)
 Fourth Street East (1970)
 Last Respects (1971)
 Tiffany Street (1974)
 A Family Fortune (1978)
 Counselors-at-law (1980)

Short stories 
 "The Horse That Could Whistle 'Dixie'"
 "The Captain's Tiger"
 "A Dime a Throw"
 "My Father Sits in the Dark"
 "Good Man, Bad Man"
 "Slipping Beauty"
 "Shoe-shine"
 "The Night I Met Einstein"
 "Monsoon"
 "The Tuxedos"

Theatre
 Fiorello! (1959)
 Tenderloin (1960)
 I Can Get It for You Wholesale (1962)
   Duke Ellington's Pousse-Cafe (1966)
 The Mother Lover (1969) one performance
   Asterisk! A comedy of terrors (1969)

Film and television
 The Damned Don't Cry (1950)
 Invitation (1952) based on Weidman's short story "R.S.V.P."
 The Eddie Cantor Story (1953)
 "Wanted: Poor Boy" (1955) (TV episode of Star Tonight)
 Slander (1956)
 "The Hole Card" (1957) (TV episode of Schlitz Playhouse of Stars)
 "All I Survey" (1958) (TV episode of General Electric Theater)
The Reporter (1964) with Harry Guardino

Essays
 Letter of Credit
 Traveler's Cheque
 Back Talk

References

Further reading
Joel Shatzky, Michael Taub, "Jerome Weidman (1913- )", Contemporary Jewish-American novelists: a bio-critical sourcebook, Greenwood Press (July 30, 1997), pp 457–460
"Weidman, Jerome." Encyclopædia Britannica. 2009. Encyclopædia Britannica Online.

External links
 Jerome Weidman Collection at the Harry Ransom Center
 
 
 Alistair Cooke delivered an oral obituary in his Letter from America dated 20 Oct 2003 and entitled Separated by language.

American Ashkenazi Jews
20th-century American novelists
American male novelists
Pulitzer Prize for Drama winners
1913 births
1998 deaths
Jewish American novelists
Jewish American dramatists and playwrights
Writers from Manhattan
20th-century American dramatists and playwrights
American male dramatists and playwrights
20th-century American male writers
Novelists from New York (state)
Tony Award winners
20th-century American Jews